is a Japanese actress. She is known for her roles in Nana and Virgin Snow.

Career
Miyazaki started working in the entertainment industry at the age of four. Initially she appeared mostly in commercials, magazine advertisements, and as an extra in television dramas. Miyazaki made her film debut in Ano Natsu no Hi at the age of 14.

Also at the age of 14, Miyazaki began to draw international attention for her role as the survivor of a traumatic bus hijack in Shinji Aoyama's Eureka. The film won the International Federation of Film Critics Prize at the Cannes Film Festival 2000, and resulted in her receiving the Best Actress award at the Japanese Professional Movie Awards. She also made her musical debut in The Little Prince in 2003.

Later, Miyazaki won Best Actress award in the Cinemanila International Film Festival for her performance in Harmful Insect. She teamed up with Aoyama again in Eli, Eli, Lema Sabachthani?, an Un Certain Regard selection at Cannes 2005. Later in the same year, she co-starred with Mika Nakashima in the mainstream and commercially successful Nana.

She won the Galaxy Individual Award for her performance in the NHK drama Atsuhime in 2008.

Endorsements
Miyazaki has appeared in commercials for major corporations including Aflac, Tokyo Metro, NTT DoCoMo and Olympus. In early 2008, she was selected as Emporio Armani's new print advertisement model. Miyazaki has been the face of the Japanese popular apparel brand Earth music&ecology since 2010.

Humanitarian activities
In recent years, Miyazaki has taken a more prominent position in humanitarian activism projects.

She travelled with her older brother and fellow actor, Masaru Miyazaki, to Bangladesh in 2005 to experience poverty firsthand, and they highlighted the problems then found in their 2006 photobook Tarinai Peace. 

The siblings travelled to Denmark and Finland in 2006 to investigate global warming. Their experiences were then published in their 2007 photobooks Love, Peace, and Green Tarinai, Peace2.

Miyazaki took part in the Gold Ribbon Walking event in Roppongi, Tokyo in 2008 to raise awareness and funds for childhood cancer.

Her 2008 film, Children of the Dark, addresses issues of child exploitation.

Personal life 
Miyazaki married actor Sosuke Takaoka, her partner since she was fifteen, on 15 June  2007. They divorced in December 2011, with Takaoka subsequently accusing her of committing adultery on his Twitter account. Miyazaki married Junichi Okada on 23 December 2017.

Filmography

Film

TV dramas

Dubbing
Franny's Feet, Franny

Awards

References

External links
 Aoi Miyazaki Official Website 
 

 Aoi Miyazaki Pictures 

1985 births
Living people
Japanese film actresses
Japanese female models
Japanese television actresses
Actresses from Tokyo
Asadora lead actors
Taiga drama lead actors
Japanese child actresses
20th-century Japanese actresses
21st-century Japanese actresses